Marvin Nicholas Johnson (born 1 December 1990) is an English professional footballer who plays as a winger for Sheffield Wednesday.

Career

Early career
Johnson began his career with Solihull Moors, and spent a loan spell at Coleshill Town. While a Solihull Moors player he won the County FA Cup in May 2009 representing Birmingham FA. In March 2010 he was linked with a transfer to Rushall Olympic, but he instead signed for Romulus, and was their top scorer in the 2011–12 season.

While playing for Romulus, Johnson had a five-day trial at Championship club Burnley in December 2011, and also received interest from League Two side Crewe Alexandra. He moved from Romulus to Kidderminster Harriers in February 2012. In January 2013 he received interest from a number of Football League clubs, including Crewe Alexandra, Colchester United and Northampton Town.

After a loan spell with Hednesford Town at the end of the 2013–14 season, Johnson signed a new one-year contract with the Harriers in June 2014.

Motherwell
In February 2015 he was one of four players to sign for Scottish club Motherwell on transfer deadline day. Before signing with Motherwell he had been in advanced talks with Football League club Yeovil Town. Johnson signed a three-year contract extension with Motherwell in June 2015.

At the end of the 2014-2015 season, with Motherwell facing potential relegation from the Scottish Premiership, Johnson featured in both legs of their play-off tie against Rangers, who had finished in third place in the Championship. After helping them to a 3–1 win in the first leg at Ibrox, Johnson scored Motherwell's first goal in a 3–0 victory in the second leg at Fir Park that ensured their Premiership survival.

Oxford United
On 31 August 2016, transfer deadline day, Johnson signed for Oxford United of League One for an undisclosed sum which according to the Oxford Mail is believed to be a club record fee, in the region of £650,000. On 23 November, the same week his second child was born, he scored his first goal for the club, the only goal in a 1–0 League One victory over Gillingham at the Kassam Stadium. In his first season, having already appeared 9 times for Motherwell (scoring 4 times), Johnson made 52 appearances for Oxford (39 of them in league fixtures) and scored 6 goals (3 in the league). He played in the final of the League Trophy at Wembley (a game Oxford lost 2–1 to Coventry City).

Middlesbrough
After prolonged speculation about his Oxford future, during which he was linked with Hull City and Birmingham City, Johnson signed a three-year contract with Middlesbrough on deadline day, 31 August 2017, after serving one season of his three-year contract. The undisclosed transfer deal was described by Oxford chairman Darryl Eales as "highly attractive", and believed to be in the region of £2.5 million.

He moved on loan to Sheffield United in August 2018.

His contract expired at the end of the 2019–20 season, but he signed a short-term extension given the extended season in light of coronavirus. He signed a new one-year contract with the club in August 2020. On 28 May 2021 it was announced that he would leave Middlesbrough at the end of the season, following the expiry of his contract.

Sheffield Wednesday
On 5 August 2021, Johnson joined recently relegated EFL League One club Sheffield Wednesday. He made his Sheffield Wednesday debut a few days later, coming off the bench as a second half substitute for Andre Green against Charlton Athletic on the opening day of the season. He scored his first goal for Sheffield Wednesday in an EFL Trophy tie against Newcastle United U21s on 31 August 2021. On 21 May 2022, it was confirmed the club had exercised an option to retain him for another season.

Personal life
Johnson is of Jamaican descent through his paternal grandfather. As of November 2016 Johnson had two children, a boy and a girl.

Career statistics

Honours
Oxford United
EFL Trophy runner-up: 2016–17

Sheffield United
EFL Championship runner-up: 2018–19

References

1990 births
Living people
Footballers from Birmingham, West Midlands
English footballers
English sportspeople of Jamaican descent
Solihull Moors F.C. players
Coleshill Town F.C. players
Romulus F.C. players
Kidderminster Harriers F.C. players
Hednesford Town F.C. players
Motherwell F.C. players
Oxford United F.C. players
Middlesbrough F.C. players
Sheffield United F.C. players
Sheffield Wednesday F.C. players
English Football League players
National League (English football) players
Scottish Professional Football League players
Association football wingers